Patrick Dorgan is a Danish soul and R&B singer signed to Copenhagen Records. His debut single "On the Way Down" charted among top three on Hitlisten, the official Danish singles chart. His song was also chosen as "Song of the Week" on Denmark's DR P3 Radio.

Shortly before Dorgan released his first single "On the Way Down" he had announced several small live shows, but after the success of the single, Dorgan upgraded the venues—every show was sold out and the single entered the top 3 on iTunes. Furthermore the single received substantial airplay, staying in top 20 for more than 15 weeks.

As a young aspiring artist Dorgan was inspired by the Danish singer Asger Rosenberg, whose bohemian lifestyle was reflected in his live performances. Seeing him perform became a defining moment for Dorgan, and in the following years Dorgan followed Rosenberg to jazz clubs.

Dorgan's second single is "Marilyn". Both singles were included on his debut album Painkillers, released in January 2016.

In 2022, he was announced to be one of the finalists of the Dansk Melodi Grand Prix 2022 with the song "Vinden suser ind".

Discography

Albums and EP

Other songs
2016: "Going Home" HEDEGAARD ft. Nabiha & Patrick Dorgan

Awards and nominations

References

Danish male singers
Year of birth missing (living people)
Living people